Sander Gillé and Joran Vliegen were the reigning champions from when the tournament was last held in 2019, but chose not to defend their title.

Sander Arends and David Pel won the title, defeating Andre Begemann and Albano Olivetti in the final, 6–4, 6–2.

Seeds

Draw

Draw

References

External links
Main draw

Swedish Open - Doubles
2021 Men's Doubles